Nivedita Joshi-Saraf ( Joshi; born 10 January 1965) is an Indian actress who works in Marathi and Hindi language films and television serials. She is married to actor Ashok Saraf. Joshi-Saraf has played Asawari in the Marathi-language serial Aggabai Sasubai on Zee Marathi from 2019 to 2021, a role she reprised in the spin-off Aggabai Sunbai.

Personal life
Nivedita Joshi began her acting career at the age of 10 in the Marathi film industry. She married actor Ashok Saraf in 1990. They have a son named Aniket Saraf who is a chef.

Filmography

Films

Television

Plays 

 Tilak–Agarkar  
 Akhercha Sawall 
 Premachya Gava Jave
 Shrimant
 Tuzya-Mazyat
 Cottage No.54
 Hasat Khelat
 Vahto Hi Durvanchi Judi
 Vegal Vhayachay Mala
 Sangeet Sanshay Kallol
 Wada Chirebandi
Magna Talyakathi
Mi, Swara Aani Te Dogha

Awards

References

External links

1965 births
Living people
Indian film actresses
Actresses in Marathi cinema
Actresses in Hindi cinema